Actinochaetopteryx actifera is a species of parasitic fly in the family Tachinidae.

Distribution
Philippines.

References

Diptera of Asia
Dexiinae
Insects described in 1953
Insects of the Philippines